RMMV Stirling Castle was a British ocean liner of the Union-Castle Line built by Harland & Wolff in Belfast for the Southampton to South Africa mail service. She was launched on 15 August 1935 and was the first of two identical sister ships, being joined a few months later by the Athlone Castle. 

A third, slightly larger, ship of the class, the Capetown Castle, joined them in 1938.

Propulsion
Harland and Wolff built her two Burmeister & Wain engines under license. They were the largest marine oil engines constructed in Britain until then. Each engine was a double-acting 10-cylinder marine two-stroke diesels developing 24,000 hp with bore x stroke  x .

Service
Stirling Castle left Southampton on her maiden voyage on 7 February 1936. In August of that year she set a new record for the route, reaching Table Bay in 13 days 9 hours, beating the previous record of 14 days, 18 hours, and 57 minutes  had set in 1893.

During World War II, Stirling Castle was used as a troopship. She came through the war unscathed after steaming some 505,000 miles and carrying 128,000 personnel.

She was released from government service in 1946. In 1946, she sailed from Southampton on 31 August for Australia arriving at Fremantle on 28 September. Her builders then refitted her and she resumed passenger service in 1947.

The mail service was accelerated in 1965 and Stirling Castle and her sisters had insufficient speed to maintain the new schedule. They were replaced by two new fast cargo ships (the new schedule required only seven ships rather than eight) and Stirling Castle was withdrawn from service upon arrival at Southampton on 30 November 1965.

Fate
A proposed sale to Taiwan breakers (where her sister had gone two months earlier) fell through and she was instead sold for scrapping in Japan. She left Southampton on 1 February 1966 for Mihara. She arrived there on 3 March 1966 to be broken up by Nichimen Co.

References

Further reading
, illustrated description of the ship

External links
 An account of life on board this ship and others of the Union-Castle Line in the 1960s
 Photo of Stirling Castle's engines before installation

1935 ships
Ocean liners
Ships built by Harland and Wolff
Ships built in Belfast
Ships of the Union-Castle Line
World War II merchant ships of the United Kingdom